mg is a monthly business magazine covering the recreational and medical cannabis business, meeting growing demand for news and information as more states legalize marijuana and the industry and its regulations evolve.

The magazine is named after the abbreviation for milligram, the metric used to measure the THC (psychoactive component) and CBD (non-psychoactive component) in cannabis products.

Regular sections include Harvest (news and statistics), Corner Office, Top Shelf (dispensaries), and Products. Monthly features cover cannabis-industry entrepreneurs, industry activists, and special reports on topics including retailing and branding, manufacturing, and packaging. The magazine also provides commentary on legal and social issues impacting the cannabis industry, from contributors like Ricardo Baca, who writes a monthly column.

It was founded by Darren Roberts, CEO of CANN Media Group LLC, in 2015. In October 2018, the publication released its first supplemental issue on "Soil & Nutrients."

References

External links
Official Website

Lifestyle magazines published in the United States
Monthly magazines published in the United States
Cannabis magazines
Cannabis media in the United States
Magazines published in Los Angeles
Magazines established in 2015